Kozluca is a village in the Ovacık District, Tunceli Province, Turkey. The village is populated by Kurds of the Aslanan tribe and had a population of 17 in 2021.

The hamlets of Akgil, Anneler, Hasanlar, Işıklı, Koçlar, Mahmutlar, Pancarlı, Soğukpınar and Tepe are attached to the village.

References 

Kurdish settlements in Tunceli Province
Villages in Ovacık District